The 2019 African Beach Games were the inaugural edition of the international beach sports competition between the nations of Africa, organised by the Association of National Olympic Committees of Africa (ANOCA). The first Games were held on the island of Sal, Cape Verde in June 2019.

In the ten-day competition, a total of 45 nations competed in 28 events across 11 sports. Teqball was also included as a demonstration sport on 18 June.

The Games were awarded to the Cabo Verdean Olympic Committee (COC) at the ANOCA General Assembly in Djibouti in May 2017. The host contract was signed in March 2018 between the City Hall of Sal, the Association of National Olympic Committees of Africa (ANOCA) and the Cabo Verdean Olympic Committee (COC), to carry out of the first African Beach Games 2019.

Branding
The logo is the silhouette of the African continent, while the mascot is a tortoise named Krexteu.

Venues
 Santa Maria Beach Park - 3×3 Basketball, Beach handball, Coastal rowing, Beach soccer, Football freestyle, Karate, Kiteboarding, Open water swimming, Teqball (demonstration)
 Athletics Circuit - Athletics
 Arena 2 - Beach tennis, Beach volleyball

Participating nations
45 out of 54 nations participated. Chad, Comoros, Eritrea, Eswatini, Ethiopia, Gabon, São Tomé and Príncipe, Somalia and South Africa did not participate.

Calendar

Medal table

Results

3×3 Basketball

Athletics

Beach handball

Beach soccer

Beach tennis

Beach volleyball

Coastal rowing

Football freestyle

Karate

Kitesurfing

Open water swimming

Demonstration result

Teqball

References

External links
 Results

 
2019
African Beach Games
African Beach Games
Beach Games
Sports competitions in Cape Verde